Luke Donald (born 4 February 1971) is a former Australian rules footballer who played three games for St Kilda in the Australian Football League (AFL) in 1990. He scored 3 goals in total, and was recruited from CBC St Kilda in the Victorian Amateur Football Association (VAFA).

References

External links

Living people
1971 births
St Kilda Football Club players
Australian rules footballers from Victoria (Australia)